Tomocerus vulgaris is a species of elongate-bodied springtail in the family Tomoceridae. It is found in Europe.

References

External links

 

Collembola
Articles created by Qbugbot
Animals described in 1871